Utricularia menziesii, commonly known as redcoats, is a perennial, terrestrial carnivorous plant that belongs to the genus Utricularia (family Lentibulariaceae). It is endemic to the coastal regions of Western Australia.

See also 
 List of Utricularia species

References

External links 

Carnivorous plants of Australia
Eudicots of Western Australia
menziesii
Lamiales of Australia